The Marshall Indians were a minor league baseball team based in Marshall, Texas, United States that played from 1923 to 1927 in the East Texas League (1923–1926) and Lone Star League (1927). Notable players include Homer Peel, George Watkins and Elon Hogsett. The team finished with a winning record only once over the course of its existence, and it never finished above third place in the league.

References

Baseball teams established in 1923
Defunct minor league baseball teams
Marshall, Texas
Defunct baseball teams in Texas
Sports clubs disestablished in 1927
1923 establishments in Texas
1927 disestablishments in Texas
Baseball teams disestablished in 1927
East Texas League teams